Industrial zone can refer to:

 Industrial park, an area zoned for industrial development
 Industrial region, a part of a country with high industrial development
 Industrial zoning, the practice of designating an area for industrial development